Sam the Olympic Eagle was the mascot of the 1984 Summer Olympics which were held in Los Angeles. He is a bald eagle, the national bird of the host nation, the United States. Intended as a patriotic symbol, being named Sam also suggests a kinship with Uncle Sam, another American symbol. The mascot was designed by Bob Moore, an artist for Disney.

Guests of Disneyland, as well as those reading documentation about mascot designs for the Olympics, often confuse the mascot for another Disney mascot named Eagle Sam, host of the former Disneyland attraction America Sings, and designed by animator Marc Davis in c. 1973. He shares the name of Sam the Eagle from The Muppet Show, but the design is vastly different. He is still known as Eagle Sam in Japan, where an animated series of the same name ran during 1983, the year preceding the Summer Olympics. Even after the conclusion of the Games, Sam the Eagle is still used to promote a track and field event, the Mt. SAC Relays at Mt. San Antonio College, specifically its "LA84 Youth Days" promotion for youth interested in athletics, run by a charitable group founded during the Olympics.

External links

 A brief summary with samples, describing the development of Sam
 A brief biography of Bob Moore, Sam's character designer
 Olympic references and merchandise further identifying the origin of Sam
 

1983 anime television series debuts
1984 Summer Olympics
American culture
Bird mascots
Fictional birds of prey
Olympic mascots
Fictional characters from Los Angeles